This is a list of the notable alumni of the University of Mumbai, one of the largest universities in the world, and its affiliated colleges.

Arts

Business

Humanities and Social Sciences

Journalism

Law

Military

Politics

Heads of State and Government

Other politicians, civil servants, and diplomats

Religion

Royalty and Nobility

Science, Technology, Engineering, and Mathematics

Sports

Notable faculty

References

Notes

Citations 

University of Mumbai
Lists of people by university or college in India